St. Lawrence State Park Golf Course is a  state park and golf course located in the town of Oswegatchie on the St. Lawrence River between the town of Morristown and the city of Ogdensburg in St. Lawrence County, New York.

Facilities
St. Lawrence State Park offers a nine-hole golf course, picnic areas, hiking, cross-country skiing, and snowmobiling.

See also
 List of New York state parks

References

External links
 New York State Parks: St. Lawrence State Park Golf Course

State parks of New York (state)
Golf clubs and courses in New York (state)
Parks in St. Lawrence County, New York